Canada–Chile Free Trade Agreement (CCFTA) is a trade agreement between Canada and Chile. It was signed on December 5, 1996 in Santiago, Chile and came into effect on July 5, 1997. Tariffs on 75 percent of bilateral trade were immediately eliminated. It was Canada's first free trade agreement with a Latin American nation (other than Mexico), and was Chile's first full free trade agreement. Over the first decade, trade between Canada and Chile increased more than 300%, with the trade of goods rising from $718 million in 1996 to $2.7 billion in 2010. Bilateral service trade increased to $164 million by 2005. Canadian investments in Chile reached $13.3 billion in 2010, and Canada has been the largerst source of new investment in Chile.

In 2012, Canadian prime minister Stephen Harper and Chilean president Sebastian Piñera announced the expansion to the CCFTA, with a financial services chapter in which Canadian financial institutions will enjoy preferential access to the Chilean market and can compete on a level playing field vis-à-vis their competitors. This financial services chapter came into effect in October 2013.

In 2015, Prime Minister Justin Trudeau tasked his Minister of International Trade, Chrystia Freeland, with expanding the CCFTA in her mandate letter.

History of trade balances

Amounts in millions of Canadian dollars.

See also
 Canada–Chile relations
Rules of Origin
Market access
Free-trade area
Tariffs

References

External links 
Free trade agreement at
 Chile Aduana (Customs)
 Chile Foreign Affairs Ministry
 Foreign Affairs, Trade and Development Canada
 Free trade agreements forms
Market Access Map (A free tool developed by International Trade Centre, which identify customs tariffs, tariff rate quotas, trade remedies, regulatory requirements and preferential regimes applicable to products, including Canada–Chile Free Trade Agreement)
Rules of Origin Facilitator (A free tool jointly developed by International Trade Centre, World Trade Organization and World Customs Organization which enables traders to find specific criteria and general origin requirements applicable to their products, understand and comply with them in order to be eligible for preferential tariffs. The tool is very useful for traders who want to gain benefit from Canada–Chile Free Trade Agreement)

Free trade agreements of Chile
Free trade agreements of Canada
1996 in Chile
1996 in Canada
Treaties concluded in 1996
Treaties entered into force in 1997
Canada–Chile relations
1996 in Canadian law
Presidency of Eduardo Frei Ruiz-Tagle